Olivibacter ginsengisoli is a  Gram-negative, aerobic,  heterotrophic, rod-shaped, non-spore-forming and non-motile bacterium from the genus of Olivibacter which has been isolated from Korea.

References

External links
Type strain of Olivibacter ginsengisoli at BacDive -  the Bacterial Diversity Metadatabase

Sphingobacteriia
Bacteria described in 2008